One ship and one shore base of the Royal Australian Navy have been named HMAS Derwent, after the Derwent River in Tasmania.

 , a River-class destroyer escort which entered service in 1964, left service in 1994, and sunk as an artificial reef

Battle honours
One battle honour was awarded to the destroyer escort Derwent, which will be inherited by future ships of the name:
 Malaysia 1964–66

See also
 , several British warships of the same name

References

Royal Australian Navy ship names